Milntown Castle was an early 16th-century castle which was situated near Milton, in Easter Ross, in the Scottish Highlands.

History 
The castle was built by the Munro of Milntown family, a cadet branch of the Clan Munro. In 1656, the castle and estate was sold to George Mackenzie, 1st Earl of Cromartie also known as George MacKenzie of Tarbet. He renamed the estate New Tarbat after Tarbat Castle (now more commonly known as Ballone Castle), the family's original seat near Portmahomack. Mackenzie had the Milntown Castle pulled down and only part of the basement survives.  He then replaced the castle with a new mansion built nearby. When the new mansion was built, the old Milntown Castle was remodelled as part of the garden. That  mansion was itself demolished and in 1787 was replaced with a Georgian house (now known as Tarbat House) by his descendant John Mackenzie, Lord MacLeod.

Accounts of the castle 
Although the castle no longer exists, descriptions of the building are provided in some books including the History of the Earldom of Sutherland by Sir Robert Gordon (1580–1625) and the History of the Munros of Fowlis written by Alexander Mackenzie in 1898.

Sir Robert Gordon wrote:

Alexander Mackenzie wrote:

See also 
 Castles in Scotland

References 

Castles in Highland (council area)
Clan Munro